Laurie Dean Walker (born 14 October 1989) is an English professional footballer who plays as a goalkeeper for National League club Barnet.

Career

Early career
Walker joined the academy of Milton Keynes Dons at the age of 16 and left the club in July 2009 at the end of his scholarship period. Following his release, Walker had brief spells with then Conference Premier club Cambridge United and League Two club Morecambe.

He made his professional debut on 6 February 2010 for Cambridge United in a 1–0 defeat away to Crawley Town. With Morecambe, on 31 August 2010 Walker featured in a 1-0 first round League Trophy defeat away to Macclesfield Town.

Non-League
After his exit from Morecambe at the end of the 2010–11 season, Walker went on to spend much of his career playing in non-League football for Kettering Town, Brackley Town, Leamington, Oxford City and Hemel Hempstead Town. For Hemel Hempstead Town, Walker made over 180 appearances in all competitions across two spells with the club.

Milton Keynes Dons
Following the mutual termination of his contract with Hemel Hempstead Town, on 1 July 2019 Walker returned to his boyhood club, newly promoted League One side Milton Keynes Dons. Prior to signing, Walker had spent time training with the club's first team as well as working as one of the club's academy goalkeeping coaches.

Walker was immediately loaned out to National League South club Hampton & Richmond Borough ahead of the 2019–20 season with the option of an immediate recall. On 18 December 2019, Walker signed for Chelmsford City on loan.

Following the conclusion of the 2019–20 season, Walker was one of nine players released by the club, but re-joined on 12 August 2020 ahead of the 2020–21 campaign. Walker finally made his professional first team debut for the club on 8 September 2020 in a 3–1 EFL Trophy group stage win over Northampton Town.

On 13 March 2021, Walker joined League Two club Oldham Athletic on an emergency loan as cover for injured goalkeeper Ian Lawlor. At the age of 31, he made his professional league debut the same day in a 4–2 home defeat to former club Cambridge United. 

On 11 June 2021, Walker signed a contract extension to keep him at MK Dons for the 2021–22 season. On 17 August 2021, Walker returned to Oldham Athletic on a seven-day emergency loan. On 29 October 2021, Walker joined National League side, Aldershot Town on a short-term loan until January 2022.

Stevenage
Walker joined League Two club Stevenage on a permanent transfer on 6 January 2022.

Barnet 
On 20 June 2022, Walker joined National League side Barnet on a permanent transfer from Stevenage.

Career statistics

References

External links

1989 births
Living people
Sportspeople from Bedford
Footballers from Bedfordshire
English footballers
Association football goalkeepers
Hampton & Richmond Borough F.C. players
Morecambe F.C. players
Milton Keynes Dons F.C. players
Stevenage F.C. players
Oldham Athletic A.F.C. players
Cambridge United F.C. players
Kettering Town F.C. players
Brackley Town F.C. players
Hemel Hempstead Town F.C. players
Oxford City F.C. players
Chelmsford City F.C. players
Aldershot Town F.C. players
Barnet F.C. players
English Football League players
National League (English football) players
Milton Keynes Dons F.C. non-playing staff